Lists of governors of colonial America cover the governors of Thirteen Colonies of Britain in North America that declared independence in 1776, as well as governors of the Spanish provinces of New Spain and the French provinces of New France that later were absorbed into the United States.

Thirteen Colonies
 List of colonial governors of Connecticut
 List of colonial governors of Georgia
 List of colonial governors of Maryland
 List of colonial governors of Maine
 List of colonial governors of Massachusetts
 List of colonial governors of New Hampshire
 List of colonial governors of New Jersey
 List of colonial governors of New York
 List of colonial governors of North Carolina
 List of colonial governors of Pennsylvania
 List of colonial governors of Rhode Island
 List of colonial governors of South Carolina
 List of colonial governors of Virginia

New Spain and New France
 List of governors of California before 1850
 List of colonial governors of Florida
 List of colonial governors of Louisiana
 List of Spanish governors of New Mexico
 List of colonial governors of Texas

See also
 Director of New Netherland